Ammana Ashish Reddy (born 24 February 1991) is an Indian cricketer.  Reddy is a right-handed batsman who bowls right-arm medium pace.  He was born in Secunderabad, Telangana. Reddy has played First class, List A and Twenty20 cricket for Hyderabad.

He along with Ravi Kiran holds the record for the highest 10th wicket partnership in List A history(128)

Indian Premier League
Additionally, he has played for the Deccan Chargers in the 2012 Indian Premier League.

2013
In this season, Ashish Reddy has been picked by Sunrisers Hyderabad (which replaced Deccan Chargers) and played a few games and he was sidelined as he picked up an injury that put him out of action for rest of the IPL.

2014
Ashish Reddy was selected to play for Sunrisers Hyderabad

2015
In the 2015 Indian Premier League, Ashish Reddy was retained by the Sunrisers Hyderabad and took Darren Sammy's wicket in the match against RCB. He was also part of the thrilling match against Delhi Daredevils in which he had hit Angelo Mathews for a six scoring 15 runs from 8 balls, where his team finally lost by a mere 4 runs. Ashish hit crucial 22 runs in 8 balls against Kings XI Punjab in which SRH won the match.

References

External links

Ashish Reddy at deccanchargers.com

1991 births
Living people
People from Secunderabad
Indian cricketers
Hyderabad cricketers
Deccan Chargers cricketers
Sunrisers Hyderabad cricketers
Cricketers from Hyderabad, India